Three ships of the Royal Navy have borne the name HMS Bentinck, named in honor of John Bentinck:

  was an iron paddle vessel launched in 1832. She was commanded by Richard Collinson and used to survey significant portions of the China Coast. She was purchased in 1842 and renamed . She was put up for sale in 1855.
  was a Captain-class frigate launched in 1943 and returned to the US Navy in 1946.

Royal Navy ship names